Mahendra Kumar (born 16 August 1939) is an Indian former cricketer. He played first-class cricket for Andhra and Hyderabad between 1960 and 1973.

See also
 List of Hyderabad cricketers

References

External links
 

1939 births
Living people
Indian cricketers
Andhra cricketers
Hyderabad cricketers
Cricketers from Vijayawada